The Boxing Tournament at the 1998 Asian Games was held at the IMPACT Arena in Bangkok, Thailand from 7 December to 18 December 1998.

The competition included only men's events.

Medalists

Medal table

Participating nations
A total of 159 athletes from 27 nations competed in boxing at the 1998 Asian Games:

References
Amateur Boxing

External links
Results

 
1998 Asian Games events
1998
Asian Games
1998 Asian Games